John Tourtellotte may refer to:

 John E. Tourtellotte (1869–1939), American architect
 John Eaton Tourtellotte (1833–1891), American Union Army general